In the Line of Duty: Ambush in Waco is a 1993 American made-for-television action drama film starring Tim Daly that aired on NBC on May 23, 1993.

Synopsis
The film portrays the events leading up to and at the start of the Waco siege.

Cast 

Tim Daly as David Koresh
William O'Leary as Adrian
Neal McDonough as Jason
Lewis Smith as Robert Williams
Marley Shelton as Laura
Jeri Ryan as Rebecca
Stephen Miller
Debra Jo Rupp as Dorrie
Clu Gulager as McLennan County Sheriff
Gordon Clapp as Glenn
Richard McGonagle
Susanna Thompson as Meg
Heather McAdam as Michelle
Kris Kamm
Dan Lauria as Bob Blanchard
Adrienne Stiefel as Libby
Julie Ariola as Carol
Cara Buono
Glenn Morshower as Conway LeBleu
Anne Gee Byrd as Sue Llamas
Miriam Byrd-Nethery as Harriet
Dave Lowry as Bill
Juan A. Riojas as Hector
Michael de la Force featured uncredited ATF agent
Alana Austin as Betsy
Kent Broadhurst as Cole
Carlease Burke as Lizabeth
James Marsden as Steven Willis
Robert Tekampe as Adventist Man
David Cook
Geoffrey Rivas as Luis
Brent Anderson as Stan
T.J. Kennedy as Editor
Jeff Allin as Tribble
Gwyn Little as Farmer
Staci Wilson as Delivery Driver
Brad Farnsworth as T.V. Reporter
Milt Tarver as Cameron
Darryl Cox as Clerk
Keith D. Allgeier as Gun Dealer
C. Alan Rawlins as Drug Suspect
Shawn Aaron Davis as Mailman
Curtis Sprague as Sprague
Greg Wilson as Reporter

Production
Filming took place in the Tulsa, Oklahoma area.

Reception
Todd Everett of Variety.com noted that, even though it was already being filmed during the actual series of events, the film is "an engrossing affair, with no signs of hasty production". John O'Connor of The New York Times also noted the rapid production of the film that aired "little more than a month after the Texas fire that claimed the lives of David Koresh and 71 other people" and determined that "the elapsed time between news story and television docudrama grows ever shorter as networks scramble to exploit a seemingly inexhaustible based-on-fact marketplace." Due to this fact, Howard Rosenberg of the Los Angeles Times points out that the film does not focus on the final storming of the compound on April 19 but rather "the initial storming of the Mt. Carmel compound 51 days earlier" and concludes that "Phil Penningroth's script provides a rationale not only for the initial assault but also for the more controversial one on April 19 that resulted in mass deaths".

Penningroth's regret
Screenplay writer Phil Penningroth has regretted his involvement with this telefilm, calling it pro-ATF "propaganda" in the years since its premiere, expressing his feelings in an August 2001 article he wrote for the online magazine Killing the Buddha.

References

External links
 

American television films
Federal Bureau of Investigation
1993 television films
1993 films
American films based on actual events
Films set in Texas
Waco siege
Films shot in Oklahoma
Films directed by Dick Lowry
NBC network original films
Films set in 1993
Films about religious violence in the United States